Pronocera is a genus of long-horned beetles in the family Cerambycidae. There are at least three described species in Pronocera.

Species
These three species belong to the genus Pronocera:
 Pronocera angusta (Kriechbaumer, 1844)
 Pronocera collaris (Kirby in Richardson, 1837)
 Pronocera sibirica (Gebler, 1848)

References

Further reading

 

Callidiini